Johnny Mountain is a retired weathercaster for both KABC-TV and KCBS-TV in Los Angeles, California.  He has been described as "one of the most recognizable faces -- and names -- in local TV news."

Prior to his time in Los Angeles, Mountain spent one year at WLS-TV in Chicago, Illinois. He joined ABC7 Eyewitness News in Los Angeles in 1978 to become an weeknight meteorologist. When George Fischbeck retired, Mountain was shifted to weekday mornings from 5-7AM and afternoon at 5PM when his partner Dallas Raines took Mountain's 11PM spot.

Mountain was notable for his off-the-wall humor; on one occasion, in response to a viewer question about grunion fish, he held up a specimen during his weathercast, explaining "This is a front view of a grunion; this is a side view; and this..." (placing a small paper bag with "eye holes" over the fish) "...is the Unknown Grunion."

In January 2005, Mountain decided to leave KABC and gave an on-air farewell. In May 2005, he joined CBS2 to reunite with his former KABC partners Ann Martin (1994), Harold Greene (2001), Laura Diaz (2002) and sportcaster Jim Hill (who first joined in 1976, then rejoined in 1992).

Mountain retired in March 2010 as part of a "restructuring" of KCBS news operations.

References

External links

Television anchors from Los Angeles
Television anchors from Chicago
Living people
Year of birth missing (living people)